Venman may refer to:

Jack Venman (1911–1994), Australian landowner
Venman Bushland National Park, national park in Australia